Claire Benedict (born 28 July 1951) is a British actress known for her work in classical productions on the British stage, but best known for portraying the principal character Mma Ramotswe in the continuing radio adaptations of The No 1 Ladies' Detective Agency. She won a Time Out Award for Best Performance for her portrayal of Sophia Adams in Errol John's Moon on a Rainbow Shawl, directed by Maya Angelou. She lives in Manchester.

Early life 
Benedict was born in Antigua and began to act at Norwood Secondary School for Girls, then Kingsway Further Education College on Gray's Inn Road, London. After two years at Kingway College, she gained entrance to the London Academy of Music and Dramatic Art (LAMDA). After leaving LAMDA, Benedict worked with Theatre in Education (TIE) in London then trained with the Black Theatre Workshop of Montréal.

Career 
In her first ten years after completing her training, Benedict worked on the British stage in leading roles for smaller theatre companies and supporting roles for larger theatre companies until in 1988, when she received a Time Out award for Best Performance for her portrayal of Sophia Adams in Errol John's Moon on a Rainbow Shawl, directed by Maya Angelou.

In 1992, Benedict joined the Royal Shakespeare Company (RSC) to do three plays, Odyssey, Cleopatra and Tamburlaine. On Cleopatra, Benedict was taken on as an understudy for Clare Higgins when not many people of colour were playing the character of Cleopatra. In November 1992, Benedict was needed to step in at short notice and had not had time to fully rehearse the role. Carol Chillington-Rutter's book Enter the Body explores this subject with reference to Benedict's performance, where she explores why women of colour have traditionally been cast as Charmain and white women Cleopatra.

By 1994, The Independent included Benedict in a shortlist of "seasoned thoroughbred Shakespearians, gutsy actors who are assured verse speakers".<ref>[https://www.independent.co.uk/arts-entertainment/theatre-25-under-35-its-the-role-for-actresses-of-that-uncertain-age-today-imogen-stubbs-tomorrow-1416519.html THEATRE / 25 under 35: It's the role for actresses of that uncertain age. Today, Imogen Stubbs. Tomorrow . . ? Georgina Brown plays casting director – Georgina Brown, The Independent, 26 July 1994]</ref> She is now an associate artist at the RSC.

Benedict has for many years worked in radio drama, where she is known for portraying the principal character Mma Ramotswe in the radio adaptations of Alexander McCall Smith's The No 1 Ladies' Detective Agency novels. On television, she played a series regular in Call Red, and numerous supporting roles.

Benedict has played the part of Iyaloja in four separate productions of Wole Soyinka's play Death and the King's Horseman: Royal Exchange Theatre, Manchester directed by Phyllida Lloyd in 1990; Royal National Theatre directed by Rufus Norris in 2009; and two productions for BBC Radio 3 directed by Alby James in 1995 and directed by Pauline Harris in 2014.

Benedict has worked with Lenny Henry on many occasions: supporting roles in his television series; playing his character's father's girlfriend then wife in all four series of Rudy's Rare Records on BBC Radio 4; playing the lead role in the first radio play he wrote Corrinne Come Back and Gone; and in two of the series of Bad Faith radio plays in which he played the lead role. In February 1994, during rehearsals for the Young Vic's Omma'', the entire cast, including Benedict and Toby Jones, quit the production when they thought director Tim Supple was failing to give them appropriate direction.

Credits

Theatre

Film

Television

Radio

References

External links

1951 births
Living people
Alumni of the London Academy of Music and Dramatic Art
British stage actresses
British radio actresses
British television actresses
British film actresses
British Shakespearean actresses
Royal Shakespeare Company members
People educated at The Norwood School